The Faisalabad Development Authority (FDA) is a body responsible for undertaking and monitoring planned developments in the city of Faisalabad, in Punjab, Pakistan. The body acts as a regulatory authority for overseeing the construction of houses, commercial developments and residential areas in the city.
It has three main wings

Urban Development Wing,
Water and Sanitation Agency (WASA),
Traffic Engineering Planning Agency (TEPA).

The office of Faisalabad Development Authority is situated on the Railway Station square at the intersection of Mall Road and Circular Road.

References

Faisalabad
Organisations based in Faisalabad
Urban development authorities
Government agencies of Punjab, Pakistan